The Eternal Daughter is a 2022 Gothic mystery drama film produced, written and directed by Joanna Hogg. It stars Tilda Swinton in a double role, playing both a middle-aged filmmaker and her elderly mother who are guests at a mysterious hotel. Joseph Mydell and Carly-Sophia Davies feature in supporting roles.

The Eternal Daughter had its world premiere at the 79th Venice International Film Festival on 6 September 2022, and was released in the United States on 2 December 2022 by A24.

Plot
Julie takes her elderly mother, Rosalind, to a secluded hotel. Julie's father has recently died and Julie, a filmmaker, wants to spend time with her mother in the hopes of making a film about her.

The hotel is a former family home of Rosalind's and she recounts painful memories she has, including a miscarriage, that occurred at the location.

On Rosalind's birthday, Julie prepares a special day for her, but when Rosalind reveals she is not hungry at suppertime, Julie breaks down revealing that she feels she cannot be happy when her mother is not happy and that she fears for the future as she has no children to take care of her when she is older. While bringing her mother a birthday cake, she cries and reveals that she is alone at the table and that her mother died in the past.

The following day, Julie works on her screenplay and then goes home.

Cast
The cast includes:
 Tilda Swinton as Julie and Rosalind Hart
 Joseph Mydell as Bill
 Carly-Sophia Davies as receptionist

Production
On January 18, 2021, it was announced that a secret film written and directed by Joanna Hogg and starring Tilda Swinton had wrapped filming. On January 27, 2021, it was confirmed that A24 acquired the worldwide distribution rights.

The film was shot in secret in Wales during the COVID-19 pandemic lockdown.

Release
The film had its world premiere at the 79th Venice International Film Festival on 6 September 2022. It also screened at the 2022 Toronto International Film Festival. and the 60th New York Film Festival. It was released in the United States on 2 December 2022.

Reception

Year-end lists
The film appeared on a number of critics' lists of the best films of 2022: 

 2nd – Molly Haskell, Screen Slate
 2nd – David Sims, The Atlantic
 2nd – Florence Almozini, Film Comment Poll
 3rd – Monica Castillo, RogerEbert.com
 3rd – Justin Chang, The Los Angeles Times
 3rd – Reverse Shot

References

External links
 

2022 drama films
2022 independent films
2020s American films
2020s British films
2020s English-language films
2020s mystery drama films
A24 (company) films
American independent films
American mystery drama films
BBC Film films
British independent films
British mystery drama films
Films about mother–daughter relationships
Films directed by Joanna Hogg
Films set in hotels
Films shot in Wales